Andrew Howard Morgan (born 30 November 1945) is an English former first-class cricketer.

Morgan was born at Hastings in November 1945. He later studied at St Edmund Hall, Oxford where he played first-class cricket for Oxford University. He made his debut against Gloucestershire at Oxford in 1966. He played first-class cricket for Oxford until 1969, making eleven appearances. He scored 381 runs in his eleven appearances, at an average of 23.81 and a high score of 59 not out.

References

External links

1945 births
Living people
People from Hastings
Alumni of St Edmund Hall, Oxford
English cricketers
Oxford University cricketers